Tipton railway station is located in the town of Tipton in the borough of Sandwell, West Midlands, England and was known as Tipton Owen Street until 1968.  It is situated on the West Coast Main Line.  The station is operated by West Midlands Railway, which also provides all services.

At the southern end of the station, there was a level crossing, though this was closed in January 2010 on the opening of a relief road which undercuts the railway.

The station was closed in early 2010 for refurbishment which allowed the platforms to be extended to accommodate longer trains than previously. The redevelopment also included new waiting areas, easier access to the station, increased car park size, new subway, improved security and a new bus interchange.

Services 
Tipton is served by West Midlands Railway services between Walsall and Wolverhampton, which are sponsored by Transport for West Midlands.

On Sundays, there is typically one train per hour between Birmingham and Wolverhampton only.

Three Main West Midlands Railway Express services call at this railway station - the first is a morning peak service from Crewe to New Street; the second evening peak service from Birmingham New Street to Shrewsbury; and the third is the final service from Birmingham New Street to Crewe.

Nearby attractions 
Black Country Living Museum
Dudley Zoo

References

External links 

Rail Around Birmingham and the West Midlands: Tipton station

Tipton
Railway stations in Sandwell
DfT Category E stations
Former London and North Western Railway stations
Railway stations in Great Britain opened in 1852
Railway stations served by West Midlands Trains
1852 establishments in England